Pentateucha inouei, the Taiwanese hirsute hawkmoth, is a species of moth of the family Sphingidae. It is known from Taiwan. The habitat consists of alpine forests.

The larvae have been recorded feeding on Ilex formosana.

References

Sphingulini
Moths described in 1997